Pericyma cruegeri, the poinciana looper, is a moth of the family Erebidae. The species was first described by Arthur Gardiner Butler in 1886. It is found in south-east Asia including Hong Kong, Taiwan, Vietnam, Thailand, Sumatra, Peninsular Malaysia, Borneo, the Philippines, New Guinea, and in Australia, northern New South Wales and Queensland. Furthermore, it is an introduced species in Hawaii and Guam, where it was first detected in 1971. In Japan, it was first detected in 1986 in Ishigaki Island and the living area is expanded to Okinawa Island by 2000.

The wingspan is about 40 mm. Adults are brown with a complex pattern of dark lines and patches, and often with some white areas. They are very variable in coloration.

The larvae feed on the foliage of Caesalpiniaceae species, including Peltophorum pterocarpum and Delonix regia and can cause extensive damage. They feed communally at first but separate when older.

Pupation occurs in a cocoon covered in debris on the ground some distance from the food plant. The cocoon has a length of about 20 mm.

References

External links

Ophiusina
Moths of Asia
Moths of Oceania
Moths described in 1886